Brian "Horse" Johnson (born April 6, 1979) is a former American football fullback who played five seasons with the San Jose SaberCats of the Arena Football League (AFL). He played college football at the University of New Mexico.

College career
Johnson played college football for the New Mexico Lobos. He was a four-year collegiate letterman and three-year starter for the Lobos. He was also a two-time first-team All-Mountain West Conference defensive lineman selection.

Professional career
Johnson signed with the San Jose SaberCats of the AFL on November 16, 2002. He played for the SaberCats from 2003 to 2008, earning Second-team All-Arena honors.

He was signed by the San Francisco 49ers of the National Football League (NFL) on August 18, 2004. Johnson was allocated to NFL Europe to play for the Berlin Thunder on February 7, 2005. After having ankle surgery in August 2005, he was declared out for the 2005 season. He was released by the 49ers on August 29, 2005.

References

External links
Just Sports Stats
College stats

Living people
1979 births
Players of American football from Phoenix, Arizona
Players of American football from Colorado
American football fullbacks
New Mexico Lobos football players
San Jose SaberCats players
San Francisco 49ers players
Berlin Thunder players
Sportspeople from Littleton, Colorado